Jonathan Jackson Conklin (born August 17, 1994) is an American football offensive tackle for the Cleveland Browns of the National Football League (NFL). He played college football at Michigan State.

Early years
Conklin was born in Plainwell, Michigan on August 17, 1994, to Darren Conklin and Jennifer Jackson. He attended Plainwell High School in Plainwell, where he played football under his father who was the head coach. He also played basketball in high school.

College career
Conklin joined the Michigan State University football team as a walk-on player. After redshirting his first year, Conklin started 13 of 14 games at either right or left offensive tackle his redshirt freshman year in 2013. As a sophomore, he started all 13 games at left tackle. Conklin was selected as a 2015 First-team All-American (Sporting News, USA Today) as well as the 2015 First-team All-Big Ten (coaches, media). During his career with the Spartans, Conklin started in 38 of his 39 career games (35 at left tackle, three at right tackle). On January 6, 2016, Conklin announced he would forgo his senior season and declare for the 2016 NFL Draft.

Professional career
Conklin was projected to be a top ten pick going into the 2016 NFL Draft by NFL draft experts and scouts after he had a successful junior year where he only gave up two sacks and was penalized twice. Conklin attended private workout of pre-draft visits with multiple teams, including the Buffalo Bills, San Diego Chargers, Pittsburgh Steelers, Tennessee Titans, New York Jets, Indianapolis Colts, Atlanta Falcons, Detroit Lions, and Tampa Bay Buccaneers during his pre-draft process. 

At the conclusion of the pre-draft process, Conklin was projected to be a first round pick and was expected to among the first 15 players selected by NFL draft experts and scouts. He was ranked as the third best offensive tackle prospect in the draft by DraftScout.com, NFL analyst Mike Mayock, and ESPN analyst Jeff Legwold. He was ranked the fourth best offensive tackle by Sports Illustrated.

Tennessee Titans
The Tennessee Titans selected Conklin in the first round (8th overall) of the 2016 NFL Draft. The Tennessee Titans traded their first (15th overall) and third round (76th overall) picks in the 2016 NFL Draft to the Cleveland Browns in order to receive the eighth overall pick, as well as a sixth round pick (176th overall), to draft Conklin. Conklin was the second offensive tackle drafted after the unexpected draft fall of top-ranked offensive tackle Laremy Tunsil.

2016 season

On May 26, 2016, Conklin signed a four-year, $15.89 million rookie contract with $15.44 million guaranteed and a signing bonus of $9.76 million.

Conklin entered training camp slated as the starting right tackle, replacing Byron Bell. Head coach Mike Mularkey named Conklin the starting right tackle to begin the regular season. Conklin joined starting left tackle Taylor Lewan, offensive guards Quinton Spain and Chance Warmack, and center Ben Jones.

He made his professional regular season debut and first NFL start in the Titans' season-opening 25–16 loss against the Minnesota Vikings. On December 21, 2016, it was announced that Conklin was selected as an alternate for the 2017 Pro Bowl. He started in all 16 games during his rookie season in 2016 and was named First-team All-Pro. Conklin received an overall grade of 88.9 from Pro Football Focus. His grade was the fifth highest among all offensive linemen in 2016 and was the highest overall grade among all rookie offensive linemen. The Tennessee Titans' offensive line was ranked as the top offensive line in the league in 2016 by Pro Football Focus. The Titans finished 9-7 from a 3–13 record the previous season and narrowly missed the playoffs.

2017 season

Mularkey retained Conklin and Taylor Lewan as the starting offensive tackles in 2017. Conklin started all 16 games at right tackle in 2017 and received an overall grade of 81.8 from Pro Football Focus. His grade ranked 12th among all offensive tackles in 2017. The Tennessee Titans finished second in the AFC South with a 9–7 record in 2017 and earned a playoff berth for the first time since 2008. On January 6, 2018, Conklin started in his first career playoff game as the Titans defeated the Kansas City Chiefs 22–21 in the AFC Wildcard Game. On January 13, 2018, Conklin tore his ACL during a 35–14 loss to the New England Patriots in the AFC Divisional Round.

2018 season

On January 15, 2018, the Tennessee Titans announced their decision to fire Mularkey. On January 20, 2018, the Tennessee Titans announced their decision to hire the Houston Texans' defensive coordinator Mike Vrabel as their new head coach. On January 26, 2018, it was reported that Conklin's surgery to repair his torn ACL had successfully been completed. Offensive coordinator Matt LaFleur retained the starting offensive line, that also included starting left tackle Taylor Lewan, offensive guards Quinton Spain and Josh Kline, and center Ben Jones.

Conklin missed the first three games of the season in order to recover from his ACL injury. Conklin suffered an injury on November 5, 2018, during a 28-14 Week 9 victory against the Dallas Cowboys. He soon entered concussion protocol. Conklin would not play the next week against the New England Patriots. However, he did return for the Week 11 game against the Indianapolis Colts. He then suffered a knee injury during Week 14 against the Jacksonville Jaguars and was placed on injured reserve five days later. The Titans finished 9-7 for the third consecutive year.

2019 season

On May 1, 2019, the Titans declined the fifth-year option on Conklin's contract, making him a free agent in 2020.
Conklin started all 16 games for the Titans in 2019, helping Derrick Henry win the NFL rushing yards title. The Titans finished 9-7 for the fourth consecutive year and qualified for the playoffs as the number 6 seed in the AFC. In the playoffs, the Titans won upsets over the New England Patriots and the Baltimore Ravens, with Conklin blocking for Henry as he ran for nearly 200 yards in each game before losing the AFC Championship Game to eventual Super Bowl champions Kansas City Chiefs with Conklin starting all three playoff games.

Cleveland Browns
On March 20, 2020, Conklin signed a three-year, $42 million contract with the Cleveland Browns. He was placed on the reserve/COVID-19 list by the team on November 18, 2020, and activated three days later. Conklin was named to the 2020 NFL All-Pro Team, along with three of his teammates: defensive end Myles Garrett and guards Joel Bitonio and Wyatt Teller.

On November 6, 2021, Conklin was placed on injured reserve with an elbow injury. He was activated on November 27. The next day a Week 12 Sunday Night Football matchup against the Baltimore Ravens, Conklin suffered a right knee injury putting him out of the game. The next day, on November 29, it was revealed that Conklin tore his patellar tendon and was placed on season ending injured reserve.

On December 23, 2022, Conklin signed a four-year, $60 million contract extension with the Browns through the 2026 season.

Personal life
Conklin resides with his wife Caitlyn Riley and his daughter.

References

External links
Tennessee Titans bio
Michigan State Spartans bio

1994 births
Living people
People from Plainwell, Michigan
Players of American football from Michigan
American football offensive tackles
Michigan State Spartans football players
Tennessee Titans players
Cleveland Browns players
Ed Block Courage Award recipients